The Himalayas, or Himalaya, is a mountain range in Asia, separating the plains of the Indian subcontinent from the Tibetan Plateau. The range has some of the planet's highest peaks, including the very highest, Mount Everest. Over 100 peaks exceeding  in elevation lie in the Himalayas.

The Himalayas abut or cross five countries: Bhutan, India, Nepal, China, and Pakistan. The sovereignty of the range in the Kashmir region is disputed among India, Pakistan, and China. The Himalayan range is bordered on the northwest by the Karakoram and Hindu Kush ranges, on the north by the Tibetan Plateau, and on the south by the Indo-Gangetic Plain. Some of the world's major rivers, the Indus, the Ganges, and the Tsangpo–Brahmaputra, rise in the vicinity of the Himalayas, and their combined drainage basin is home to some 600 million people; 53 million people live in the Himalayas. The Himalayas have profoundly shaped the cultures of South Asia and Tibet. Many Himalayan peaks are sacred in Hinduism and Buddhism; the summits of several—Kangchenjunga (from the Indian side), Gangkhar Puensum, Machapuchare, Nanda Devi and Kailas in the Tibetan Transhimalaya—are off-limits to climbers.

Its western anchor, Nanga Parbat, lies just south of the northernmost bend of the Indus river. Its eastern anchor, Namcha Barwa, lies immediately west of the great bend of the Yarlung Tsangpo River.

Name

They are now known as "", usually shortened to "the Himalayas".

The name of the range is sometimes also given as Himavan in older writings, including the Sanskrit epic Mahabharata. Himavat (Sanskrit: हिमवत्) or Himavan Himavān (Sanskrit: हिमवान्) is a Hindu deity who is the personification of the Himalayan Mountain Range. Other epithets include Himaraja (Sanskrit: हिमराज) or Parvateshwara (Sanskrit: पर्वतेश्वर).

In western literature, some writers refer to it as the Himalaya. This was also previously transcribed as Himmaleh, as in Emily Dickinson's poetry and Henry David Thoreau's essays.

Geography and key features

The Himalayas consist of parallel mountain ranges: the Sivalik Hills on the south; the Lower Himalayan Range; the Great Himalayas, which is the highest and central range; and the Tibetan Himalayas on the north. The Karakoram are generally considered separate from the Himalayas.

In the middle of the great curve of the Himalayan mountains lie the  peaks of Dhaulagiri and Annapurna in Nepal, separated by the Kali Gandaki Gorge. The gorge splits the Himalayas into Western and Eastern sections both ecologically and orographically – the pass at the head of the Kali Gandaki the Kora La is the lowest point on the ridgeline between Everest and K2 (the highest peak of the Karakoram range). To the east of Annapurna are the  peaks of Manaslu and across the border in Tibet, Shishapangma. To the south of these lies Kathmandu, the capital of Nepal and the largest city in the Himalayas. East of the Kathmandu Valley lies the valley of the Bhote/Sun Kosi river which rises in Tibet and provides the main overland route between Nepal and China – the Araniko Highway/China National Highway 318. Further east is the Mahalangur Himal with four of the world's six highest mountains, including the highest: Cho Oyu, Everest, Lhotse and Makalu. The Khumbu region, popular for trekking, is found here on the south-western approaches to Everest. The Arun river drains the northern slopes of these mountains, before turning south and flowing to the range to the east of Makalu.

In the far east of Nepal, the Himalayas rise to the Kangchenjunga massif on the border with India, the third highest mountain in the world, the most easterly  summit and the highest point of India. The eastern side of Kangchenjunga is in the Indian state of Sikkim. Formerly an independent Kingdom, it lies on the main route from India to Lhasa, Tibet, which passes over the Nathu La pass into Tibet. East of Sikkim lies the ancient Buddhist Kingdom of Bhutan. The highest mountain in Bhutan is Gangkhar Puensum, which is also a strong candidate for the highest unclimbed mountain in the world. The Himalayas here are becoming increasingly rugged with heavily forested steep valleys. The Himalayas continue, turning slightly northeast, through the Indian State of Arunachal Pradesh as well as Tibet, before reaching their easterly conclusion in the peak of Namche Barwa, situated in Tibet inside the great bend of the Yarlang Tsangpo river. On the other side of the Tsangpo, to the east, are the Kangri Garpo mountains. The high mountains to the north of the Tsangpo including Gyala Peri, however, are also sometimes included in the Himalayas.

Going west from Dhaulagiri, Western Nepal is somewhat remote and lacks major high mountains, but is home to Rara Lake, the largest lake in Nepal. The Karnali River rises in Tibet but cuts through the centre of the region. Further west, the border with India follows the Sarda River and provides a trade route into China, where on the Tibetan plateau lies the high peak of Gurla Mandhata. Just across Lake Manasarovar from this lies the sacred Mount Kailash in the Kailash Ranges, which stands close to the source of the four main rivers of Himalayas and is revered in Hinduism, Buddhism, Sufism, Jainism, and Bonpo. In Uttarakhand, the Himalayas are regionally divided into the Kumaon and Garhwal Himalayas with the high peaks of Nanda Devi and Kamet. The state is also home to the important pilgrimage destinations of Chaar Dhaam, with Gangotri, the source of the holy river Ganges, Yamunotri, the source of the river Yamuna, and the temples at Badrinath and Kedarnath.

The next Himalayan Indian state, Himachal Pradesh, is noted for its hill stations, particularly Shimla, the summer capital of the British Raj, and Dharamsala, the centre of the Tibetan community and government in exile in India. This area marks the start of the Punjab Himalaya and the Sutlej river, the most easterly of the five tributaries of the Indus, cuts through the range here. Further west, the Himalayas form much of the disputed Indian-administered union territory of Jammu and Kashmir where lie the mountainous Jammu region and the renowned Kashmir Valley with the town and lakes of Srinagar. The Himalayas form most of the south-west portion of the disputed Indian-administered union territory of Ladakh. The western end terminates at a magnificent point near Nanga Parbat where the Himalayas intersect with the Karakoram and Hindu Kush ranges, in the disputed Pakistani-administered territory of Gilgit-Baltistan. Some portion of the Himalayas, such as the Kaghan Valley, Margalla Hills and Galyat tract, extend into the Pakistani provinces of Khyber Pakhtunkhwa and Punjab.

Geology

The Himalayan range is one of the youngest mountain ranges on the planet and consists mostly of uplifted sedimentary and metamorphic rock. According to the modern theory of plate tectonics, its formation is a result of a continental collision or orogeny along the convergent boundary (Main Himalayan Thrust) between the Indo-Australian Plate and the Eurasian Plate. The Arakan Yoma highlands in Myanmar and the Andaman and Nicobar Islands in the Bay of Bengal were also formed as a result of this collision.

About 50 million years ago this fast-moving Indo-Australian Plate had completely closed the Tethys Ocean, the existence of which has been determined by sedimentary rocks settled on the ocean floor and the volcanoes that fringed its edges. Since both plates were composed of low density continental crust, they were thrust faulted and folded into mountain ranges rather than subducting into the mantle along an oceanic trench. An often-cited fact used to illustrate this process is that the summit of Mount Everest is made of unmetamorphosed marine Ordovician limestone with fossil trilobites, crinoids and ostracods from this ancient ocean.

Today, the Indian plate continues to be driven horizontally at the Tibetan Plateau, which forces the plateau to continue to move upwards. The Indian plate is still moving at 67 mm per year, and over the next 10 million years it will travel about  into Asia. About 20 mm per year of the India-Asia convergence is absorbed by thrusting along the Himalaya southern front. This leads to the Himalayas rising by about 5 mm per year, making them geologically active. The movement of the Indian plate into the Asian plate also makes this region seismically active, leading to earthquakes from time to time.

During the last ice age, there was a connected ice stream of glaciers between Kangchenjunga in the east and Nanga Parbat in the west. In the west, the glaciers joined with the ice stream network in the Karakoram, and in the north, they joined with the former Tibetan inland ice. The glacier snowline (the altitude where accumulation and ablation of a glacier are balanced) was about  lower than it is today. Thus, the climate was at least  colder than it is today.

Hydrology

Despite their scale, the Himalayas do not form a major watershed, and a number of rivers cut through the range, particularly in the eastern part of the range. As a result, the main ridge of the Himalayas is not clearly defined, and mountain passes are not as significant for traversing the range as with other mountain ranges. The rivers of the Himalayas drain into two large river systems:
 The western rivers combine into the Indus Basin. The Indus itself forms the northern and western boundaries of the Himalayas. It begins in Tibet at the confluence of Sengge and Gar rivers and flows north-west through India into Pakistan before turning south-west to the Arabian Sea. It is fed by several major tributaries draining the southern slopes of the Himalayas, including the Jhelum, Chenab, Ravi, Beas and Sutlej rivers, the five rivers of the Punjab.
 The other Himalayan rivers drain the Ganges-Brahmaputra Basin. Its main rivers are the Ganges, the Brahmaputra and the Yamuna, as well as other tributaries. The Brahmaputra originates as the Yarlung Tsangpo River in western Tibet, and flows east through Tibet and west through the plains of Assam. The Ganges and the Brahmaputra meet in Bangladesh and drain into the Bay of Bengal through the world's largest river delta, the Sunderbans.

The northern slopes of Gyala Peri and the peaks beyond the Tsangpo, sometimes included in the Himalayas, drain into the Irrawaddy River, which originates in eastern Tibet and flows south through Myanmar to drain into the Andaman Sea. The Salween, Mekong, Yangtze and Yellow River all originate from parts of the Tibetan Plateau that are geologically distinct from the Himalaya mountains and are therefore not considered true Himalayan rivers. Some geologists refer to all the rivers collectively as the circum-Himalayan rivers.

Glaciers
The great ranges of central Asia, including the Himalayas, contain the third-largest deposit of ice and snow in the world, after Antarctica and the Arctic. Its glaciers include the Gangotri and Yamunotri (Uttarakhand) and Khumbu glaciers (Mount Everest region), Langtang glacier (Langtang region) and Zemu (Sikkim).

In contrast, equatorial mountains in New Guinea, the Rwenzoris and Colombia have a snow line some  lower. The higher regions of the Himalayas are snowbound throughout the year, in spite of their proximity to the tropics, and they form the sources of several large perennial rivers.

In recent years, scientists have monitored a notable increase in the rate of glacier retreat across the region as a result of climate change. For example, glacial lakes have been forming rapidly on the surface of debris-covered glaciers in the Bhutan Himalaya during the last few decades. Although the effect of this will not be known for many years, it potentially could mean disaster for the hundreds of millions of people who rely on the glaciers to feed the rivers during the dry seasons. The global climate change will affect the water resources and livelihoods of the Greater Himalayan region.

Lakes

The Himalayan region is dotted with hundreds of lakes.

South of the main range, the lakes are smaller. Tilicho Lake in Nepal in the Annapurna massif is one of the highest lakes in the world. Other notable lakes include Rara Lake in western Nepal, She-Phoksundo Lake in the Shey Phoksundo National Park of Nepal, Gurudongmar Lake, in North Sikkim, Gokyo Lakes in Solukhumbu district of Nepal and Lake Tsongmo, near the Indo-China border in Sikkim.

Some of the lakes present a danger of a glacial lake outburst flood. The Tsho Rolpa glacier lake in the Rowaling Valley, in the Dolakha District of Nepal, is rated as the most dangerous. The lake, which is located at an altitude of  has grown considerably over the last 50 years due to glacial melting. The mountain lakes are known to geographers as tarns if they are caused by glacial activity. Tarns are found mostly in the upper reaches of the Himalaya, above .

Temperate Himalayan wetlands provide important habitat and layover sites for migratory birds. Many mid and low altitude lakes remain poorly studied in terms of their hydrology and biodiversity, like Khecheopalri in the Sikkim Eastern Himalayas.

Climate

Temperature
The physical factors determining the climate in any location in the Himalayas include latitude, altitude, and the relative motion of the Southwest monsoon. From north to south, the mountains cover more than eight degrees of latitude, spanning temperate to subtropical zones.  The colder air of Central Asia is prevented from blowing down into South Asia by the physical configuration of the Himalayas.  This causes the tropical zone to extend farther north in South Asia than anywhere else in the world. The evidence is unmistakable in the Brahmaputra valley as the warm air from the Bay of Bengal bottlenecks and rushes up past Namcha Barwa, the eastern anchor of the Himalayas, and into southeastern Tibet. Temperatures in the Himalayas cool by 2.0 degrees C (3.6 degrees F) for every  increase of altitude.

As the physical features of mountains are irregular, with broken jagged contours, there can be wide variations in temperature over short distances. Temperature at a location on a mountain depends on the season of the year, the bearing of the sun with respect to the face on which the location lies, and the mass of the mountain, i.e. the amount of matter in the mountain.  As the temperature is directly proportional to received radiation from the sun, the faces that receive more direct sunlight also have a greater heat buildup.  In narrow valleys—lying between steep mountain faces—there can be dramatically different weather along their two margins. The side to the north with a mountain above facing south can have an extra month of the growing season.  The mass of the mountain also influences the temperature, as it acts as a heat island, in which more heat is absorbed and retained than the surroundings, and therefore influences the heat budget or the amount of heat needed to raise the temperature from the winter minimum winter to the summer maximum.
The immense scale of the Himalayas means that many summits can create their own weather, the temperature fluctuating from one summit to another,  from one face to another, and all may be quite different from the weather in nearby plateaus or valleys.

Precipitation

A critical influence on the Himalayan climate is the Southwest Monsoon.  This is not so much the rain of the summer months as the wind that carries the rain. Different rates of heating and cooling between the Central Asian continent and the Indian Ocean create large differences in the atmospheric pressure prevailing above each. In the winter, a high-pressure system forms and remains suspended above Central Asia, forcing air to flow in the southerly direction over the Himalayas.  But in Central Asia as there is no substantial source for water to be diffused as vapour, the winter winds blowing across South Asia are dry.  
In the summer months the Central Asian plateau heats up more than the ocean waters to its south.  As a result, the air above it rises higher and higher, creating a zone of low pressure. Off-shore high-pressure systems in the Indian Ocean push the moist summer air inland toward the low-pressure system.  When the moist air meets mountains, it rises and upon subsequent cooling, its moisture condenses and is released as rain, typically heavy rain.  The wet summer monsoon winds cause precipitation in India and all along the layered southern slopes of the Himalayas.  This forced lifting of air is called the orographic effect.

Winds
The vast size, huge altitude range, and complex topography of the Himalayas mean they experience a wide range of climates, from humid subtropical in the foothills to cold and dry desert conditions on the Tibetan side of the range. For much of the Himalayas—in the areas to the south of the high mountains, the monsoon is the most characteristic feature of the climate and causes most of the precipitation, while the western disturbance brings winter precipitation, especially in the west. Heavy rain arrives on the southwest monsoon in June and persists until September. The monsoon can seriously impact transport and cause major landslides. It restricts tourism – the trekking and mountaineering season is limited to either before the monsoon in April/May or after the monsoon in October/November (autumn). In Nepal and Sikkim, there are often considered to be five seasons: summer, monsoon, autumn, (or post-monsoon), winter, and spring.

Using the Köppen climate classification, the lower elevations of the Himalayas, reaching in mid-elevations in central Nepal (including the Kathmandu valley), are classified as Cwa, Humid subtropical climate with dry winters. Higher up, most of the Himalayas have a subtropical highland climate (Cwb).

The northern side of the Himalayas, also known as the Tibetan Himalaya, is dry, cold and, generally, windswept particularly in the west where it has a cold desert climate. The vegetation is sparse and stunted and the winters are severely cold. Most of the precipitation in the region is in the form of snow during the late winter and spring months.

Local impacts on climate are significant throughout the Himalayas. Temperatures fall by 0.2 to 1.2 °C for every  rise in altitude. This gives rise to a variety of climates from a nearly tropical climate in the foothills, to tundra and permanent snow and ice at higher elevations. Thus although annual precipitation is generally higher in east than the west, local variations are often more important.

The Himalayas have a profound effect on the climate of the Indian subcontinent and the Tibetan Plateau. They prevent frigid, dry winds from blowing south into the subcontinent, which keeps South Asia much warmer than corresponding temperate regions in the other continents. It also forms a barrier for the monsoon winds, keeping them from traveling northwards, and causing heavy rainfall in the Terai region. The Himalayas are also believed to play an important part in the formation of Central Asian deserts, such as the Taklamakan and Gobi.

Climate change

Ecology

The flora and fauna of the Himalayas vary with climate, rainfall, altitude, and soils. The climate ranges from tropical at the base of the mountains to permanent ice and snow at the highest elevations. The amount of yearly rainfall increases from west to east along the southern front of the range. This diversity of altitude, rainfall, and soil conditions combined with the very high snow line supports a variety of distinct plant and animal communities. The extremes of high altitude (low atmospheric pressure) combined with extreme cold favor extremophile organisms.

At high altitudes, the elusive and previously endangered snow leopard is the main predator. Its prey includes members of the goat family grazing on the alpine pastures and living on the rocky terrain, notably the endemic bharal or Himalayan blue sheep. The Himalayan musk deer is also found at high altitudes. Hunted for its musk, it is now rare and endangered. Other endemic or near-endemic herbivores include the Himalayan tahr, the takin, the Himalayan serow, and the Himalayan goral. The critically endangered Himalayan subspecies of the brown bear is found sporadically across the range as is the Asian black bear. In the mountainous mixed deciduous and conifer forests of the eastern Himalayas, Red panda feed in the dense understories of bamboo. Lower down the forests of the foothills are inhabited by several different primates, including the endangered Gee's golden langur and the Kashmir gray langur, with highly restricted ranges in the east and west of the Himalayas respectively.

The unique floral and faunal wealth of the Himalayas is undergoing structural and compositional changes due to climate change. Hydrangea hirta is an example of floral species that can be found in this area. The increase in temperature is shifting various species to higher elevations. The oak forest is being invaded by pine forests in the Garhwal Himalayan region. There are reports of early flowering and fruiting in some tree species, especially rhododendron, apple and box myrtle.

Religions

There are many cultural and mythological aspects associated with the Himalayas. In Jainism, Mount Ashtapad of the Himalayan mountain range, is a sacred place where the first Jain Tirthankara, Rishabhdeva attained moksha. It is believed that after Rishabhdeva attained nirvana, his son, Emperor Bharata Chakravartin, had constructed three stupas and twenty four shrines of the 24 Tirthankaras with their idols studded with precious stones over there and named it Sinhnishdha. For the Hindus, the Himalayas are personified as Himavat, king of all mountains and the father of the goddess Parvati. The Himalayas are also considered to be the father of Ganga (the personification of river Ganges). Two of the most sacred places of pilgrimage for the Hindus are the temple complex in Pashupatinath and Muktinath, also known as Saligrama because of the presence of the sacred black rocks called saligrams.

The Buddhists also lay a great deal of importance on the Himalayas. Paro Taktsang is the holy place where Buddhism started in Bhutan. The Muktinath is also a place of pilgrimage for the Tibetan Buddhists. They believe that the trees in the poplar grove came from the walking sticks of eighty-four ancient Indian Buddhist magicians or mahasiddhas. They consider the saligrams to be representatives of the Tibetan serpent deity known as Gawo Jagpa. The Himalayan people's diversity shows in many different ways. It shows through their architecture, their languages, and dialects, their beliefs and rituals, as well as their clothing. The shapes and materials of the people's homes reflect their practical needs and beliefs. Another example of the diversity amongst the Himalayan peoples is that handwoven textiles display colors and patterns unique to their ethnic backgrounds. Finally, some people place great importance on jewelry. The Rai and Limbu women wear big gold earrings and nose rings to show their wealth through their jewelry. Several places in the Himalayas are of religious significance in Hinduism, Buddhism, Jainism and Sikhism. A notable example of a religious site is Paro Taktsang, where Padmasambhava is said to have founded Buddhism in Bhutan.

A number of Vajrayana Buddhist sites are situated in the Himalayas, in Tibet, Bhutan and in the Indian regions of Ladakh, Sikkim, Arunachal Pradesh, Spiti and Darjeeling. There were over 6,000 monasteries in Tibet, including the residence of the Dalai Lama. Bhutan, Sikkim and Ladakh are also dotted with numerous monasteries.

Resources
The Himalayas are home to a diversity of medicinal resources. Plants from the forests have been used for millennia to treat conditions ranging from simple coughs to snake bites. Different parts of the plants – root, flower, stem, leaves, and bark – are used as remedies for different ailments. For example, a bark extract from an Abies pindrow tree is used to treat coughs and bronchitis. Leaf and stem paste from an Andrachne cordifolia is used for wounds and as an antidote for snake bites. The bark of a Callicarpa arborea is used for skin ailments. Nearly a fifth of the gymnosperms, angiosperms and pteridophytes in the Himalayas are found to have medicinal properties, and more are likely to be discovered.

Most of the population in some Asian and African countries depends on medicinal plants rather than prescriptions and such. Since so many people use medicinal plants as their only source of healing in the Himalayas, the plants are an important source of income. This contributes to economic and modern industrial development both inside and outside the region. The only problem is that locals are rapidly clearing the forests on the Himalayas for wood, often illegally.

See also

 Eastern and Western Himalaya
 Indian Himalayan Region
 List of Himalayan peaks and passes
 List of Himalayan topics
 List of mountains in India, Pakistan, Bhutan, Nepal and China
 List of Ultras of the Himalayas
 Trekking peak

References

Sources

General

Geology

Climate

Ecology

Society

Pilgrimage and Tourism

Mountaineering and Trekking

Further reading
 Aitken, Bill, Footloose in the Himalaya, Delhi, Permanent Black, 2003. .
 Berreman, Gerald Duane, Hindus of the Himalayas: Ethnography and Change, 2nd rev. ed., Delhi, Oxford University Press, 1997.
 Edmundson, Henry, Tales from the Himalaya, Vajra Books, Kathmandu, 2019. .
 Everest, the IMAX movie (1998). .
 Fisher, James F., Sherpas: Reflections on Change in Himalayan Nepal, 1990. Berkeley, University of California Press, 1990. .
 Gansser, Augusto, Gruschke, Andreas, Olschak, Blanche C., Himalayas. Growing Mountains, Living Myths, Migrating Peoples, New York, Oxford: Facts On File, 1987.  and New Delhi: Bookwise, 1987.
 Gupta, Raj Kumar, Bibliography of the Himalayas, Gurgaon, Indian Documentation Service, 1981.
 Hunt, John, Ascent of Everest, London, Hodder & Stoughton, 1956. .
 Isserman, Maurice and Weaver, Stewart, Fallen Giants: The History of Himalayan Mountaineering from the Age of Empire to the Age of Extremes. Yale University Press, 2008. .
 Ives, Jack D. and Messerli, Bruno, The Himalayan Dilemma: Reconciling Development and Conservation. London / New York, Routledge, 1989. .
 Lall, J.S. (ed.) in association with Moddie, A.D., The Himalaya, Aspects of Change. Delhi, Oxford University Press, 1981. .
 Nandy, S.N., Dhyani, P.P. and Samal, P.K., Resource Information Database of the Indian Himalaya, Almora, GBPIHED, 2006.
 Swami Sundaranand, Himalaya: Through the Lens of a Sadhu. Published by Tapovan Kuti Prakashan (2001). .
 Swami Tapovan Maharaj, Wanderings in the Himalayas, English Edition, Madras, Chinmaya Publication Trust, 1960. Translated by T.N. Kesava Pillai.
 Tilman, H. W., Mount Everest, 1938, Cambridge University Press, 1948.
 Turner, Bethan, et al. Seismicity of the Earth 1900–2010: Himalaya and Vicinity. Denver, United States Geological Survey, 2013.

External links

 The Digital Himalaya research project at Cambridge and Yale (archived)
 Geology of the Himalayan mountains
 Birth of the Himalaya
 South Asia's Troubled Waters Journalistic project at the Pulitzer Centre for Crisis Reporting (archived)
 Biological diversity in the Himalayas Encyclopedia of Earth

 
Mountain ranges
 
Mountain ranges of China
Geography of East Asia
Geography of South Asia
Landforms of East Asia
Landforms of South Asia
Physiographic divisions
Tibetan Plateau